Kirti Karshanbhai Patel (born 27 November 1969 in Indore, Madhya Pradesh) is an Indian cricketer who plays for Madhya Pradesh. He made his first-class debut in 1987 and played until 1998 in 61 first-class and 22 List A matches as wicket-keeper-batsman.

References

External links
 
 cricketarchive

1969 births
Living people
Indian cricketers
Madhya Pradesh cricketers
Cricketers from Indore
Wicket-keepers